John Dawson (born December 19, 1969) is a British television journalist, former news anchor at Bloomberg TV in Europe and Asia, and the founder of Acara Strategy, an Asia-based public relations firm.

While at Bloomberg, Dawson interviewed heads of state, Fortune 500 CEOs and Nobel Laureates, and was renowned for his record of breaking news and winning exclusives. He reported from the World Economic Forum in Davos, the OPEC and European Union gatherings and technology-focused 3GSM and CeBIT conferences.

In May 2015, and after 20 years with Bloomberg, Dawson resigned to transition his career to Communications.

Early life and education

Dawson was born in Port-of-Spain, Trinidad to British parents. He moved to the U.K. aged eight and was educated at Rugby School in Warwickshire. He graduated with a BA (Hons) in English & Classics from Royal Holloway College, University of London.

Journalism career

Bloomberg News (1995–1997)

Dawson joined Bloomberg News as a Graduate Intern. After a three-month internship, he joined the European Markets team as a reporter and feature writer. His work was published in The Financial Times, the New York Times and International Herald Tribune.

Bloomberg TV's European operations launched in London under Katherine Oliver, who in 2001 would be appointed New York City's Film Commissioner. Dawson transferred to television in 1997 as a writer, reporter and TV interviewer.

Bloomberg TV (1997–2015)

Self-taught as an on-air presenter, Dawson established himself as the network's lead interviewer and gained a reputation for winning exclusives through his probing interviews with Heads of State, Nobel Laureates and global leaders from industry, philanthropy, finance, sport and entertainment.

Past interviewees include UK Prime Ministers Tony Blair, Gordon Brown and John Major, Presidents Bill Clinton, F.W. de Klerk and Benigno Aquino III; Sweden's Carl Bildt, Italy's Berlusconi and Prodi, Russia's Anatoly Chubais and former Yugoslavia PM Milan Panic; Alibaba's Jack Ma, Microsoft's Steve Ballmer, BP's Lord Browne, Ireland's Tony O'Reilly, Sir Richard Branson, the IMF's Christine Lagarde; and Nobel Prize winners Professors Stiglitz and Krugman, and former CIA Director and 4-star General Petraeus.

He is also an in-demand conference moderator/speaker, having chaired numerous panels and reported from global conferences, including the World Economic Forum in Davos and the politically-charged EU, IMF, WTO and OPEC meetings.

Between 1999 and his relocation to Asia in 2010, Dawson was Chief TMT correspondent and media authority on the technology revolution, covering the 3GSM, Cable Congress and CeBit events across Europe.

Dawson's career has propelled him to the heart of the business community, where he established a strong rapport with the Fortune 500 C-Suite and developed a healthy network of contacts across media, business and politics. His exclusive 60-minute interview with General Electric's Jack Welch was selected for the U.K. Business Journalist of the Year award.

Communications career
In April 2015, Dawson resigned after 20 years with Bloomberg and transitioned to Communications. After three years as the Director of a Hong Kong-based reputation management consultancy, he was hired to advise Lawrence Ho, Founder of Melco Resorts & Entertainment and one of Asia's most dynamic CEOs.

Acara Strategy (2019–Present)
In September 2019, Dawson founded Acara Strategy, an Asia-based strategic communications agency, specialising in reputation management, media training, C-Suite/HNWI profiling and visual storytelling.

Personal life
Dawson resides in Hong Kong and has one daughter.

References

Cable Congress, Lucerne2011 

AMCHAM
American Chamber of Congress China Conference, Sept2017 

AmCham Annual Conference,2015 

BAFTA (Movies)
BAFTA, interviewing Four Weddings and a Funeral, Notting Hill movie producer Duncan Kenworthy - March2014 

German APK Business Conference, Oct 2016 - moderating keynote panels http://hongkong.ahk.de/fileadmin/ahk_hong_kong/publication/AnnualReport20162017_web.pdf

ionaire investor founder of Oaktree Capital, November2016 

ASIFMA - moderating conference,2014

External links
John Dawson on Twitter https://twitter.com/JRDAWSONTV

Living people
Bloomberg L.P. people
Alumni of Royal Holloway, University of London
British expatriates in Hong Kong
British television journalists
1969 births